Grainton is an unincorporated community in Perkins County, Nebraska, United States.

History
A post office was established at Grainton in 1918, and remained in operation until it was discontinued in 1981.

Grainton was a shipping point of grain on the railroad.

References

Unincorporated communities in Perkins County, Nebraska
Unincorporated communities in Nebraska